Quebracho is a small town (villa) in Paysandú Department in Uruguay.

Geography
The railroad track Salto - Paysandú passes through this town.

History
On 20 August 1947, the existing "urban nucleus" was elevated to "Pueblo" (village) category by the Act of Ley Nº 10.923. Until then it had been the head of the judicial section "Sarandí". On 15 October 1963, its status was elevated to "Villa" (town) by the Act of Ley Nº 13.167.

Population
In 2011, Quebracho had a population of 2,853.
 
Source: Instituto Nacional de Estadística de Uruguay

Places of worship
 St. Thérèse of Lisieux Parish Church (Roman Catholic)

References

External links
INE map of Quebracho

Populated places in the Paysandú Department